Billy O'Sullivan (born 22 September 1968) is an Irish sportsman. He played hurling with his local club Ballygunner and with the Waterford senior inter-county team.

Early life

Billy O'Sullivan was born in Ballygunner, County Waterford in 1968.  He was educated locally and from an early age he showed a great interest in hurling.  Billy won an U15 Munster Colleges with De La Salle College, Waterford. He played for a combined Fitzgibbon Cup teams from 1987-1989.

Playing career

Club

Billy plays his club hurling with his local Ballygunner team.  He had some success at underage levels and in 1988 and 1989 he won two Under-21 County medal with the club.  senior county medal with the club.  Billy added senior county medals to his collection in 1992, 1995, 1996, 1997, 1999, 2001 & 2005. In 2001 he converted county medal into a Munster club hurling title.  O'Sullivan won his seventh county championship title in 2005 playing in a 14th senior county final.
Billy also won an All-Ireland Clubs Sevens medal in 1993.

Billy still plays for Ballygunner at intermediate grade. He was elected club chairman in early 2010.

Inter-county

Billy joined the Waterford hurling team in the early 1987 and made his debut versus Kilkenny in the 1st round of the 1987 National Hurling League.

In 2000 Billy suffered a serious ankle injury against Killkenny in the national league.

Billy retired from inter-county hurling on a high after bringing Waterford back from 15 points down, scoring every point. In the first round of the Munster Championship in 2000 against Limerick.

Billy won a Railway Cup medal in 1992.

Billy is brother to the present Waterford inter-county hurler, Shane O'Sullivan.

References

1968 births
Living people
Ballygunner hurlers
Waterford inter-county hurlers
Munster inter-provincial hurlers